Brown Township is a township in Linn County, Iowa.

History
Brown Township is named for Nathan Brown, who settled in Linn County in 1839. Brown Township was organized in 1841.

References

Townships in Linn County, Iowa
Townships in Iowa
1841 establishments in Iowa Territory